Litmus is a water-soluble mixture of different dyes extracted from lichens.

Litmus may also refer to:
 "Litmus" (Battlestar Galactica), an episode of Battlestar Galactica

See also
 Litmus test (disambiguation)